Jang I-hyeon (born 4 September 1943) is a South Korean wrestler. He competed in the men's Greco-Roman bantamweight at the 1964 Summer Olympics.

References

1943 births
Living people
South Korean male sport wrestlers
Olympic wrestlers of South Korea
Wrestlers at the 1964 Summer Olympics
Place of birth missing (living people)